Home Dead is a 2001 EP by Danish band Kashmir. An in-between EP, Home Dead was made after the success of The Good Life, and before the band rediscovered themselves with Zitilites. The music on this album, is a reflection of the crisis depicted in Rocket Brothers, a documentary film about the band.

Track listing
 "Undisturbed" – 2:42
 "Home Dead" – 5:06
 "The Ghost Of No One (feat. Randi Laubek)" – 5:53
 "Miss You (slight return)" – 5:22
 "Just A Phase" – 3:27
 "Mom In Love, Daddy In Space (Opiate version)" – 5:06
 "Gorgeous (Opiate version)" – 6:39

Kashmir (band) albums
2001 EPs
Albums produced by Joshua (record producer)